Whalley railway station serves the village of Whalley in Lancashire, England. The station has two platforms, slightly offset from each other. It is unstaffed, with shelters on each platform.

History
The station was host to a LMS caravan from 1934 to 1936.

It was closed on 10 September 1962 by the British Transport Commission and reopened with the rest of the line on 29 May 1994.

Facilities
There is a Ticket Vending Machine on the Manchester platform. However, there are customer help points on both platforms, automated train running announcements and timetable information posters are provided. Step free access is only available on the Manchester bound platform.

Services
There is generally an hourly service daily (including Sundays) northbound to Clitheroe and southbound to Blackburn, and Manchester Victoria and on to Rochdale, with extra trains during peak hours.

On Sundays in the summer, one or two 'Dalesrail' trains operate from Preston or Blackpool North along the Ribble Valley Line via Clitheroe to Hellifield, and onwards towards Settle and Carlisle. These also run in winter but terminate at Hellifield, where connections for stations to Carlisle can be made.

References

External links

The history of Whalley Railway Station - Ribble Valley Railway

Railway stations in Ribble Valley
DfT Category F2 stations
Former Lancashire and Yorkshire Railway stations
Railway stations in Great Britain opened in 1850
Railway stations in Great Britain closed in 1962
Railway stations in Great Britain opened in 1994
Reopened railway stations in Great Britain
Northern franchise railway stations